Fazil may refer to:

Given name
 Fazil (director) (born 1953), Indian filmmaker, producer and screenwriter
 Köprülü Fazıl Ahmed Pasha (1635–1676), Ottoman grand vizier
 Necip Fazıl Kısakürek (1904–1983), Turkish poet and activist
 Fazıl Hüsnü Dağlarca (1914–2008), prolific Turkish poet
 Fazil Iravani (1782–1885), second Sheikh ul-Islam of the Caucasus
 Fazil Iskander (1929–2016), Abkhaz writer
 Fazil Kaggwa (born 1995), Ugandan boxer
 Fazıl Küçük (1906–1984), Turkish Cypriot Vice President of the Republic of Cyprus
 Fazil Mammadov (born 1964), Azerbaijani politician
 Fazil Marija (born 1985), Sri Lankan rugby union player
Fazil Mustafa (born 1965), Azerbaijani politician
 Fazıl Önder (1926–1958), Turkish Cypriot journalist
 Fazil Rahu (1935–1987), Pakistani politician
 Fazıl Say (born 1970), Turkish pianist and composer

Surname
 Art Fazil, Singaporean musician
 Enderûnlu Fâzıl (1757–1810), Ottoman poet
 Irfan Fazil (born 1981), Pakistani cricketer
 Princess Nazli Fazil (1853–1913), Egyptian princess

Other uses
 Fazıl, village and municipality in the Shaki Rayon of Azerbaijan
 Fazil (film), a 1928 silent film with Charles Farrell directed by Howard Hawks

See also
 Mohammad Fazl (born 1967), Afghan extrajudicial prisoner of the United States

Arabic-language surnames
Turkish masculine given names
Azerbaijani masculine given names